Guibemantis timidus is a species of frog in the family Mantellidae.
It is endemic to Madagascar.
Its natural habitats are subtropical or tropical moist lowland forests, freshwater marshes, intermittent freshwater marshes, and heavily degraded former forest.

References

Mantellidae
Endemic frogs of Madagascar
Taxonomy articles created by Polbot
Amphibians described in 2005